Auntie Maria School (AMS) is located in Benin City, Nigeria and comprises Auntie Maria Nursery School (Toddler 1 - KG 2);  Auntie Maria Primary School (Basics 1 - 5); and Auntie Maria College (JSS 1 - 3  &  SSS1 - 3). The institution was founded in 1974 by Dame Maria Amieriye Osunde.

Bibliography
 Osunde, A. M., The Teacher My Memoirs, Benin, 2005.

References

External links
School website

Private schools in Nigeria
Education in Benin City
Educational institutions established in 1974
1974 establishments in Nigeria